Vado Football Club 1913, better known as Vado, is an Italian football club based in the city of Vado Ligure, in the province of Savona.

It plays in the Serie D championship and is best known for being the first team to win the Coppa Italia, a trophy won in 1922 by beating Udinese in the final 1–0.

History
On 1 November 1913 a group of members headed by Angelo Morixe agreed to found a football club in the Savona area, the Vado Foot-Ball Club with president Lino Pizzorno. The social colours chosen for the association were red and blue

The first pioneering club competitions were held between the spaces in front of the Fumagalli factory and the old Vado Ligure railway station, until the work for the Campo di Leo was completed. Until 1919 the football activity of the club was linked to football events of various kinds, purely of a friendly nature; later the team joined the FIGC and made its debut by participating in the regional Promozione (second level of Italian football of the time)

Just at that time, that is in the post-war period and specifically in the year 1922, the Ligurian company won the most important trophy in its history: the first edition of the Coppa Italia, beating Udinese 1–0 in the final thanks to Felice Levratto's goal. Not only that: in that season the team also won its own championship of competence, that of the Ligurian Promotion.

Two years later, in 1924, Levratto participated with the Italian national team at the Paris Olympics.

In 1925, Vado changed the playing field moving to the Campo delle Traversine, which a few years later was renamed to the memory of Ferruccio Chittolina, goalkeeper of Vado who disappeared prematurely in 1946 during a game accident with the Ligurian team's shirt. From the second half of the 1920s until 1932, the Vado served in the Second Division, third level, then fourth, of Italian football. In 1932 he was rescued in the First Division. In 1935, with the new name of Associazione Calcio Vado it failed to gain admission to the new Serie C remaining in the First Division, in the meantime downgraded to the fourth level. However, for the promotion in Serie C only one year was expected, and remained there until 1940.

In 1940 Vado in fact renounced to participate in the championship for serious economic problems; in its place was a team of the Italian Youth of Littorio, which weaved the athletes remaining in the city and enrolled in the First Division of Liguria the GIL of Vado for the 1940–41 season. The team performed well in the championship, winning their group and finishing sixth in the final one. Then it disappeared, and only after the liberation from Nazi fascism the Vado Foot-Ball Club reconstituted in 1945

In 1946 the team was officially admitted to Serie C with the motivation of having been the winner of a national cup in the past, even though it reached only the fourth round of the First Division

In 1967, the ground "Ferruccio Chittolina" was abandoned by the club that moved until 1978 in the Comunale di Quiliano. In 1976 the engineer Giovanni Ciarlo assumed the presidency of the Vado, and he himself designed the new Ferruccio Chittolina Stadium which in 1978 became the new home of the Ligurian team's home matches.

In 1992, after a friendly match with Udinese, the FIGC returned an exact copy of the trophy won 70 years ago, namely the Coppa Italia, which was sold for economic reasons in 1935 to the Vado club (in the meantime militant in Ligurian Excellence). disconnected from the club and correlated with the national war situation of the time. The trophy is exhibited in Piazza Cavour in Vado Ligure, in the Banca Cassa Risparmio di Savona.

Oscillations especially between sixth, fifth and fourth level championships mark the history of the club up to the present day. In 2013-2014 the team celebrated its 100 years of activity, and on that occasion the Municipality dedicated a special exhibition to the club. In the sporting field, the team again disputed the Serie D (group A) after five seasons in which it was absent, committed to rescaling the levels after the relegation of 2009 from Excellence to the Ligurian Promotion

The team was promoted to Serie D for the 2019–20 Serie D season and retained their league status despite finishing in the relegation zone after being readmitted for the 2020–21 Serie D season.

Stadium
Vado initially played its home games at the Campo di Leo, then moved to the new Campo delle Traversine in 1925, so called because it was built near the local train station, along the Genoa-Ventimiglia line

In 1978, the plant was named in memory of the Vadese goalkeeper Giuseppe "Ferruccio" Chittolina, who was seriously injured during Vado-Altarese match of 7 April 1946 and died in Savona a few days later.

The stadium, which has been modernized several times, is capable of 2000 spectators in two opposing stands (the largest of which has a roof), has a natural grass playing field and an athletics track.

Honours
Coppa Italia
Winners: 1922
Eccellenza Liguria
Winners: 2000–01, 2012–13, 2018–19
Promozione
Winners: 1995–96 (group A)

References

 (and machine-translated poor English) A brief history of Vado's Coppa Italia triumph in 1922

Association football clubs established in 1913
Football clubs in Liguria
Coppa Italia winning clubs
1913 establishments in Italy